Ernst Julius Wilhelm Schuppe (5 May 1836 – 29 March 1913) was a German positivist philosopher, born in Brieg, Silesia. He advocated what he called 'immanent philosophy'.

Life
In 1860 Schuppe received his doctorate in jurisprudence from the University of Berlin with a thesis on Ciceronian rhetoric. From 1861 he was a school teacher in Berlin, Breslau, Neisse, Gliwice and Bytom. In 1873 he was appointed professor of philosophy at the University of Greifswald, becoming university rector in 1884. He died in Breslau.

Thought
Schuppe is known for promoting a concept of conscious immanence, an idea in which the subject and object form a unity. His philosophy of immanence, or ego, was to be regarded with certainty and to be used as a starting point for epistemology.

Written works 
 Das menschliche Denken, (The human mind), 1870
  Erkenntnistheoretische Logik (Epistemological logic), 1878
 Grundzuge der Ethik und Rechtsphilosophie (Basic course of the ethics and philosophy of law), 1882
 Das metaphys. Motiv und die Geschichte der Philosophie im Umrisse (The metaphysical. Motive and the history of philosophy in outline), 1882 
 Der Begriff des subjektiven Rechts (The notion of subjective right), 1887
 Das Gewohnheitsrecht (The common law), 1890 
 Das Recht des Besitzes (The right of ownership), 1891. 
 Grundriß der Erkenntnistheorie und Logik (Outline of epistemology and logic) 1894
 Begriff und Grenzen der Psychologie (Concept and limits of psychology), 1896
 Die immanente Philosophie (The inherent philosophy), 1897 
 Der Solipsismus (Solipsism), 1898
 Das System der Wissenschaften und das des Seienden (The system of science and of being), 1898 
 Psychologismus und Normcharakter der Logik (Psychology and normative character of logic), 1901
 Was ist Bildung? (What is education?) 1900
 Der Zusammenhang von Leib und Seele (The relationship of body and soul). 1902.

Notes

References 
 Eisler, Rudolf: Philosophen-Lexikon. Berlin 1912, S. 663-664. (List of written works)
 Biographical information based on translation of equivalent article at the German Wikipedia.

1836 births
1913 deaths
German philosophers
Academic staff of the University of Greifswald
People from Brzeg
German male writers